The Ciptagelar is a group indigenous people which is part of the sub-Sundanese who inhabit the area around the Salak and Halimun Mountains in Indonesia, precisely in Kasepuhan Ciptagelar, Sirnaresmi Village, Cisolok District, Sukabumi Regency whose territory is directly adjacent to Cilograng District, Lebak Regency in Banten.

History
The history of Ciptagelar people began at the same time as the establishment of the Kasepuhan Ciptagelar in 1368 which according to history was founded by troops Kingdom of Sunda ruled by Sri Baduga Maharaja and was relieved of duty because Sri Baduga Maharaja wanted to do moksa. The soldiers were then separated into three groups and formed a new interconnected village. One of them is Kampung Gede which serves as the center of kasepuhan. Since then, an indigenous community has been formed, known as "Urang Ciptagelar" who currently inhabits the Kasepuhan Ciptagelar area.

Language
The language used by the Ciptagelar community is Sundanese, but most of them can also speak Indonesian well, except for parents who are 70 years old and over, some of them can't speak Indonesian. The language used by the Ciptagelar people is the same as Banten Sundanese in general, but they can tell which vocabulary is soft and which is rough, depending on who is being spoken to.

Leadership structure
The Ciptagelar people in the Kasepuhan Ciptagelar are led by a customary leader who is called "sesepuh girang". The leader of the Kasepuhan Ciptagelar community is passed down by lineage. sesepuh girang are assisted by several people who in the hierarchical structure are called "baris kolot". Baris kolot is a number of people who are used as mentors, advisors and who give consideration to the overjoyed elders related to the interests of the Kasepuhan Ciptagelar public. Each of these baris kolot has responsibilities according to its field.

Baris kolot is also tasked with regulating the system customary norms that governs society based on belief where customary sanctions are not physically given by traditional leaders and elders, but in the form of disease or bad luck that will befall. Customary values ​​and norms in their implementation are a condition for a person to be able to
identify himself as part of the Ciptagelar indigenous community.

Customary value systems and norms serve as the basis for community behaviors. Positions in custom system such as "rorokan" and "baris kolot" are things that are given based on descent, this is included in one of the norm systems that have been implemented until now. Beliefs work as a storage system for past experiences, including thoughts, memories, and interpretations of events.

Culture
The Ciptagelar people are indigenous people who strongly practice ancestral teachings and other customary norms, including community dress etiquette. The Ciptagelar community has special rules, namely using headband for men and using cloth wrapped around the waist for women. The meaning of this rule is that in life one must bond with each other and maintain cleanliness.

Then the eating procedures in the Ciptagelar community also still maintain the customs inherited by the ancestors as well as in the daily eating habits. eating procedures, namely plates must be placed on the bottom, eating is not allowed while talking, there should be no sound when spooning food on the plate, and women should not eat by sitting cross-legged. Women who use cloth everyday will be very unsightly if they sit cross-legged. In addition, women are also expected to behave gracefully, gentle, and polite.

In the Kasepuhan Ciptagelar, the people still use the old culture in separating paddy by using mortar and pestle. Grain on new rice will be separated in the morning. This activity was carried out by women from Kasepuhan Ciptagelar. The color of rice that is pounded with a mortar and pestle is different from that of milled rice. The rice is brown in color because it is still covered with rice bran. Meanwhile, rice milled with a machine will be white. The people of Ciptagelar still cook rice in the traditional way. The Ciptagelar community still maintains cooking rice in the traditional way. The existence of gas stove is only used for cooking vegetables and side dishes. Of course, this method refers to the local Sundanese culture that has been passed down from generation to generation. The tools used include furnace (Sundanese: hawu), cormorant (Sundanese: seeng), steamer (Sundanese: aseupan), and firewood.

Then also the electricity used by the Ciptagelar community comes from the Ciptagelar community itself. Kasepuhan Ciptagelar is not electrified from PLN but is powered by a micro-hydro. Micro hydro is driven by using water to generate electricity in the Kasepuhan Ciptagelar area.

Then there is the seren taun ceremony which is meant to honor the ancestors and as an expression of gratitude for the rice harvest that has been done. Various cultural arts performances are displayed in this celebration. The Seren Taun event usually lasts for 3 days 2 nights.

Religion
The Ciptagelar community is generally religious Sunni Islam, with local beliefs such as Sunda Wiwitan which is still mixed in. Ciptagelar Traditional Village or Kasepuhan Ciptagelar is also known as "Kasepuhan Islam Ciptagelar" which means the traditional leader and most of the people follow Islam.

See also
Baduy people
Bantenese people
Sundanese people

References

Ciptagelar
Ethnic groups in Indonesia
West Java